Nick Vitucci (born June 16, 1967) is a former professional ice hockey goaltender. He was the head coach of the ECHL's Toledo Walleye from 2009 to 2014. In 2008, Vitucci was inducted into the ECHL Hall of Fame.

Playing career 
During his playing career, Vitucci spent most of his time in the ECHL, but had numerous call ups including stints in the IHL with the Peoria Rivermen and in the AHL with the Maine Mariners, Hershey Bears, and Binghamton Rangers. Vitucci also spent several summers in the RHI, with the Buffalo Stampede, Empire State Cobras, Buffalo Wings, and the New Jersey Rockin' Rollers. During his career in the ECHL, Vitucci won four Riley Cups in 1989, 1990, 1994 and 1996 and was named the Finals Most Valuable Player on two occasions (1989 and 1996), one of only two players in the league's history to do so, and Goaltender of the Year in 1998. Vitucci spent at least some time in all of his 13 years of professional hockey in the ECHL and when he retired in 2001 Vitucci left as the league's career record holder in games played, minutes played, wins, most 20 win seasons, most 30 win seasons, and most losses.

Vitucci is the only goaltender in the history of professional hockey to be credited with a goal against a guarded net. In the 1996 season, while playing for the Charlotte Checkers, Vitucci shot the puck up the ice toward opposing goaltender Alain Morissette of the Louisville RiverFrogs. Morissette stopped the puck outside the goal, but spun and shot it into his own net while attempting a pass. As the most recent Checkers player to touch the puck, Vitucci was awarded a point scored against an opposing goalie—a unique feat in hockey history for any goaltender.

In 2008, Vitucci was inducted into the ECHL Hall of Fame. Vitucci was joined by ECHL founder Henry Brabham, the league's first commissioner Patrick J. Kelly, and defenceman Chris Valicevic as members of the Hall of Fame's inaugural class.

Career statistics

Coaching career 
Vitucci began his career as a coach during the 1994–95 season when he took up assistant coaching duties while playing for the Toledo Storm. Vitucci would have a second stint as a player/assistant coach during his final year as a player with the Greenville Grrrowl.

In 2002, Vitucci returned to Greenville to be their assistant coach and would leave to fill the assistant coach vacancy in Toledo after the season. Two months into the 2003–04 season, Toledo Storm head coach Steve Harrison was fired and Vitucci, who was his assistant at the time, was tabbed to be the interim head coach for the remainder of the season. At the end of the season, the Storm signed Vitucci to be their permanent replacement for Harrison and has remained the team's coach through the team suspending operations in 2007 in order to construct the new arena.

In February 2008 it was announced he would be retained as the head coach for the Walleye, which will be his fifth season in Toledo. The Storm saw success under Vitucci's tenure as the team made the playoffs in all three years with Vitucci, including a division title in 2006 and reaching the American Conference Finals in the same year. Vitucci would go on to coach the team through the middle of 2014, where he then stepped down to focus on his role as the Director of Hockey Operations. In February 2016, Vitucci left the Walleye organization and returned to the bench as an assistant coach for the Portland Pirates. Since the start of the 2016/2017 season, Vitucci has been a professional scout for the New Jersey Devils.

Coaching statistics

References

External links

1967 births
Living people
Binghamton Rangers players
Buffalo Stampede players
Buffalo Wings (inline hockey) players
Canadian ice hockey goaltenders
Carolina Hurricanes scouts
Carolina Thunderbirds players
Charlotte Checkers (1993–2010) players
ECHL coaches
Empire State Cobras players
Greensboro Monarchs players
Greenville Grrrowl players
Hampton Roads Admirals players
Hershey Bears players
Ice hockey people from Ontario
Maine Mariners players
New Jersey Rockin' Rollers players
Peoria Rivermen (IHL) players
Sportspeople from Welland
Toledo Storm players
Toledo Walleye
Toronto Marlboros players
Winston-Salem Thunderbirds players
New Jersey Devils scouts
Canadian ice hockey coaches